Chrysoteuchia diplogrammus is a moth in the family Crambidae. It was described by Zeller in 1863. It is found in Japan and the Russian Far East (Ussuri).

References

Crambini
Moths described in 1863
Moths of Japan
Moths of Asia